A by-election was held for the New South Wales Legislative Assembly electorate of Braidwood on 10 August 1860 because of the resignation of Frederick Cooper.

Dates

Results

Frederick Cooper resigned.

See also
Electoral results for the district of Braidwood
List of New South Wales state by-elections

References

1860 elections in Australia
New South Wales state by-elections
1860s in New South Wales